The 2010 IIHF World Championship Division II was an international ice hockey tournament run by the International Ice Hockey Federation. The tournament was contested from April 10–17, 2010. Participants in this tournament were separated into two separate tournament groups. The Group A tournament was contested in Naucalpan, Mexico. Group B's games were played in Narva, Estonia. Spain and Estonia won Group A and Group B, respectively, to earn promotion to Division I at the 2011 IIHF World Championship.  Meanwhile, Turkey and Israel finished last in Group A and B and were relegated to Division III for 2011.  The four teams were replaced by Serbia and Croatia, which were relegated from Division I, and Ireland and North Korea which earned promotion from Division III.

Participants

Group A

Group B

Group A tournament

Standings

Tournament Awards
 Best players selected by the directorate 
Best Goaltender: Andres de la Garma  (82 saves from 92 shots on goal)
Best Forward: Juan Munoz  (10 goals, 6 assists)
Best Defenceman: Anthony Wilson  (1 goal, 5 assists)

Fixtures
All times local.

Scoring leaders
List shows the top skaters sorted by points, then goals.

GP = Games played; G = Goals; A = Assists; Pts = Points; +/− = Plus/minus; PIM = Penalties in minutes; POS = PositionSource: IIHF.com

Leading goaltenders
Only the top five goaltenders, based on save percentage, who have played 40% of their team's minutes are included in this list.
TOI = Time On Ice (minutes:seconds); SA = Shots against; GA = Goals against; GAA = Goals against average; Sv% = Save percentage; SO = ShutoutsSource: IIHF.com

Group B tournament

Final standings

Tournament Awards
 Best players selected by the directorate
MVP: Andrei Makrov   
Best Goaltender: Mark Rajevski  (87 saves from 89 shots on goal)
Best Forward: Andrei Makrov  (14 goals, 14 assists, 53 shots)
Best Defenceman: Dmitri Suur  (5 goals, 13 assists, 27 shots)

Fixtures
All times local.

Scoring leaders
List shows the top skaters sorted by points, then goals.

GP = Games played; G = Goals; A = Assists; Pts = Points; +/− = Plus/minus; PIM = Penalties in minutes; POS = PositionSource: IIHF.com

Leading goaltenders
Only the top five goaltenders, based on save percentage, who have played 40% of their team's minutes are included in this list.
TOI = Time On Ice (minutes:seconds); SA = Shots against; GA = Goals against; GAA = Goals against average; Sv% = Save percentage; SO = ShutoutsSource: IIHF.com

References

IIHF World Championship Division II
3
IIHF World Championship Division II
2010
2010
World